This is a list of Anaheim Ducks award winners.

League awards

Team trophies

Individual awards

All-Stars

NHL first and second team All-Stars
The NHL first and second team All-Stars are the top players at each position as voted on by the Professional Hockey Writers' Association.

NHL All-Rookie Team
The NHL All-Rookie Team consists of the top rookies at each position as voted on by the Professional Hockey Writers' Association.

All-Star Game selections
The National Hockey League All-Star Game is a mid-season exhibition game held annually between many of the top players of each season. Twenty All-Star Games have been held since the Ducks entered the league in 1993, with at least one player chosen to represent the Ducks in each year except 2004. The All-Star game has not been held in various years: 1995, 2005, and 2013 as a result of labor stoppages, 2006, 2010, and 2014 because of the Winter Olympic Games, and 2021 as a result of the COVID-19 pandemic.

 Selected by fan vote
 Selected as one of four "last men in" by fan vote
 All-Star Game Most Valuable Player

Career achievements

Hockey Hall of Fame

The following is a list of Anaheim Ducks who have been enshrined in the Hockey Hall of Fame.

Lester Patrick Trophy
The Lester Patrick Trophy has been presented by the National Hockey League and USA Hockey since 1966 to honor a recipient's contribution to ice hockey in the United States. This list includes all personnel who have ever been employed by the Anaheim Ducks in any capacity and have also received the Lester Patrick Trophy.

United States Hockey Hall of Fame

Retired numbers

The Anaheim Ducks have retired three of their jersey numbers. Also out of circulation is the number 99 which was retired league-wide for Wayne Gretzky on February 6, 2000. Gretzky did not play for the Ducks during his 20-year NHL career and no Ducks player had ever worn the number 99 prior to its retirement.

Other awards

Notes

References

award winners
Anaheim Ducks